is a Fukui Railway Fukubu Line station located in the city of Fukui, Fukui Prefecture, Japan.

Lines
It is also the terminus of a branch line to Fukui Station.

Station layout
The station consists of two ground-level opposed side platforms connected by a level crossing. There is no station building, but rather two raised platforms in the median of Phoenix-dōri (Prefectural Route 30) from which customers board and disembark. During peak periods a conductor is stationed on the platform to collect fares, but at other times the station is unstaffed.

Adjacent stations

History
On November 27, 1950 Daimyōchō Station was renamed  and Shiyakushomae Station was opened. Honmachi-dōri Station abolished on July 15, 2002 and Shiyakushomae Station renamed Fukui Castles Ruins-daimyomachi Station on March 24, 2018.

Surrounding area
 Towards the west are the Fukui Prefectural Government buildings, Fukui City Hall, and the Fukui Central Post Office.
 The Fukui Textile Association building lies to the east; the Keifuku Bus Terminal is on the ground floor. Also to the east is the headquarters branch of Fukui Bank.
 Fukui Sakae Post Office is southeast of the station.

See also
 List of railway stations in Japan

References

External links

  

Railway stations in Fukui Prefecture
Railway stations in Japan opened in 1933
Fukui Railway Fukubu Line
Fukui (city)